Washington Township is one of the fourteen townships of Auglaize County, Ohio, United States. The 2010 census found 1,874 people in the township, 995 of whom lived in the unincorporated portions of the township.

Geography
Located in the southern part of the county, it borders the following townships:
Moulton Township - north
Duchouquet Township - northeast corner
Pusheta Township - east
Dinsmore Township, Shelby County - southeast corner
Van Buren Township, Shelby County - south
Saint Marys Township - west
Noble Township - northwest corner

The village of New Knoxville is located in southwestern Washington Township.

Name and history
It is one of forty-three Washington Townships statewide.

Originally part of Allen County, the township was formed in 1836.

Government
The township is governed by a three-member board of trustees, who are elected in November of odd-numbered years to a four-year term beginning on the following January 1. Two are elected in the year after the presidential election and one is elected in the year before it. There is also an elected township fiscal officer, who serves a four-year term beginning on April 1 of the year after the election, which is held in November of the year before the presidential election. Vacancies in the fiscal officership or on the board of trustees are filled by the remaining trustees.

Public services
The township is split between the Wapakoneta City School District, the Saint Marys City School District, and the New Knoxville Local School District.

The northwestern section of the township is served by the Saint Marys (45885) post office, the northeastern section by the Wapakoneta (45895) post office, the southern section by the New Knoxville (45871) post office, and the extreme southeastern section by the Botkins (45306) post office.

References

External links
County website

Townships in Auglaize County, Ohio
Townships in Ohio
1836 establishments in Ohio
Populated places established in 1836